Autobiography of a Yogi is an autobiography of Paramahansa Yogananda (5 January 1893 – 7 March 1952) first published in 1946. 

Paramahansa Yogananda was born as Mukunda Lal Ghosh in Gorakhpur, India, into a Bengali Hindu family. Autobiography of a Yogi introduces the reader to his life and his encounters with spiritual figures of both the Eastern and the Western world.  The book begins with his childhood family life and follows-on to his finding his guru, to becoming a monk and establishing his teachings of Kriya Yoga meditation.  The book continues in 1920 when Yogananda accepts an invitation to speak at a religious congress in Boston, Massachusetts, USA. He then travels across America lecturing and establishing his teachings in Los Angeles, California. In 1935, he returns to India for a yearlong visit.  When he returns to America, he continues to establish his teachings, including writing this book.

The book is an introduction to the methods of attaining God-realization and to the spiritual wisdom of the East, which had only been available to a few in 1946. The author claims that the writing of the book was prophesied long ago by the nineteenth-century master Lahiri Mahasaya (Paramguru of Yogananda).

The book has been in print for seventy years and translated into over fifty languages by Self-Realization Fellowship, a spiritual society established by Yogananda. It has been highly acclaimed as a spiritual classic, including being designated by Philip Zaleski, while he was under the auspices of HarperCollins Publishers, as one of the "100 Most Important Spiritual Books of the 20th Century." It is included in the book 50 Spiritual Classics: Timeless Wisdom from 50 Great Books of Inner Discovery, Enlightenment and Purpose by Tom Butler-Bowdon. According to Project Gutenberg, the first edition is in the public domain  and at least five publishers are reprinting it and four post it free for online reading.

Overview 

Autobiography of a Yogi examines the life and spiritual development of Paramahansa Yogananda. The book describes Yogananda's childhood family life, his search for his guru, Swami Sri Yukteswar Giri, the establishment of his first school, Yogoda Satsanga Brahmacharya Vidyalaya, and his journey to America where he lectured to thousands, established Self-Realization Fellowship and visited Luther Burbank, a renowned botanist to whom the book is dedicated. The book then describes Yogananda's return visit to India in 1935, where he encountered leading spiritual figures such as Therese Neumann in Bavaria, the Hindu saint Ananda Moyi Ma, Mahatma Gandhi, Rabindranath Tagore, Nobel Prize-winning physicist Sir C. V. Raman, and Giri Bala, "the woman yogi who never eats." Finally, Yogananda describes his return to the West, where he continued to establish his teachings in America, including the writing of the Autobiography.

The preface was written by anthropologist Walter Evans-Wentz, a writer who was a pioneer in the study of Tibetan Buddhism in the west, most notably through his translations of The Tibetan Book of the Dead and Tibet's Great Yogi Milarepa. In the preface he wrote, "His unusual life-document is certainly one of the most revealing of the depths of the Hindu mind and heart, and of the spiritual wealth of India, ever to be published in the West."

Yukteswar Giri, Yogananda's guru, told him about a significant prediction made by Lahiri Mahasaya, Yukteswar's guru. Yukteswar heard him say, "About fifty years after my passing," he said, "my life will be written because of a deep interest in yoga which the West will manifest. The yogic message will encircle the globe, and aid in establishing that brotherhood of man which results from direct perception of the One Father." In 1945, fifty years after Lahiri Mahasaya's passing in 1895, the Autobiography was complete and ready for publication.

In 1999, Autobiography of a Yogi was designated one of the "100 Most Important Spiritual Books of the 20th Century" by a panel of theologians and luminaries convened by HarperCollins publishers. According to Philip Goldberg, who wrote American Veda, "... the Self-Realization Fellowship, which represents Yogananda's Legacy, is justified in using the slogan, "The Book that Changed the Lives of Millions." It has sold more than four million copies and counting ..." Autobiography of a Yogi is the most popular of Yogananda's books and SRF has published the book into over fifty languages.

Influence

Autobiography of a Yogi has introduced meditation and yoga to many Westerners since its publication. The book has many famous advocates, particularly in the business and entertainment communities.

One of the most famous advocates of the book was Steve Jobs, the co-founder, and formerly Chairman and CEO of Apple Inc. Jobs "first read Autobiography of a Yogi as a teenager, then re-read [the book] ... once a year ever since." Marc Benioff, CEO of Salesforce.com, told his story of attending Steve Jobs' memorial service, where the attendees were handed a small brown box on their way out. "This is going to be good," he thought. "I knew that this was a decision he made, and whatever it was, it was the last thing he wanted us all to think about." The box contained a copy of the book.

George Harrison, lead guitarist of the Beatles, received his first copy of Autobiography of a Yogi from Ravi Shankar in 1966 and, according to Shankar, "that was where his (George Harrison's) interest in Vedic culture and Indian-ness began." Gary Wright, who wrote the song Dream Weaver, wrote: "In 1972, my friend George Harrison invited me to accompany him on a trip to India. A few days before we left, he gave me a copy of the book Autobiography of a Yogi by Paramahansa Yogananda. Needless to say the book inspired me deeply, and I became totally fascinated with Indian culture and philosophy.  My trip was an experience I will never forget."

Elvis Presley was introduced to Autobiography of a Yogi in 1965 by his hair dresser-turned-guru, Larry Geller. Elvis continued to study the book throughout the 1970s. He left a copy of the book behind in a Nashville hotel room on 21 January 1977. Later on this book was auctioned off with a letter of authenticity

The actress Mariel Hemingway says that she was introduced to the Autobiography of a Yogi by Peter Evans, a direct disciple of Yogananda. She was "mesmerized by the Autobiography of a Yogi and loved the whole great Hindu tradition of spiritual seeking ..."

The actor Dennis Weaver gave a copy of the book to Linda Evans, saying that it had changed his life. Evans says that,  "Because of Dennis, I took the first step in what would become a life long spiritual journey."

Andrew Weil, director of the program in Integrative Medicine at University of Arizona, wrote the book Eating Well for Optimum Health. He mentioned reading the Autobiography of a Yogi, which he said, "awakened in me an interest in yoga and Indian religious philosophies." He continued, "It is filled with wondrous tales from an exotic land, none more amazing than that of Giri Bala, 'a woman yogi who never eats.'"

The work has also attracted less favourable comments. Srinivas Aravamudan has described its contents as "miracle-infested territory" whose "single most memorable feature ... is a repetitive insistence on collocating the miraculous and the quotidian. ... The autobiography is an eclectic directory of sorts that might be dubbed a hitchhiker's guide to the paranormal galaxy". Aravamudan notes the "aggressive marketing" of the Yogoda Satsang and Self-Realization Fellowship, that Yogananda himself "worked the mass media" and used a technique described as "Guru English". He notes that Yogananda was the collator of the testimonials that purport to validate the miracles described, which appear at a rate of around one per page.

According to Chris Welch and the liner notes on the album, Tales From Topographic Oceans, a concept album recorded by Yes, the progressive rock group, was inspired by "a lengthy footnote on page 83" of Autobiography of a Yogi. The footnote describes four Shastric scriptures that cover religion, art, social life, medicine, music and architecture. On 3 March 1973, Jon Anderson was given a copy of Autobiography of a Yogi by Jamie Muir at Bill Bruford's wedding. Anderson became particularly fascinated by the footnote on page 83, which inspired him to write much of the material for Tales from Topographic Oceans.

Cholo-goth icon Rafael Reyes credits the book with saving his life and opening him to spiritual self-awareness.

James Dudley, in his book Library Journal: Autobiography of a Yogi, wrote: "Yogananda's masterly storytelling epitomizes the Indian oral tradition with its wit, charm, and compassionate wisdom.

Phil Goldberg, in his book The Life of Yogananda, states that Autobiography of a Yogi is "the book that changed the lives of millions".

Today, reading Autobiography of a Yogi has become an unofficial prerequisite for prospective students of the Self-Realization Fellowship's "Lessons for Home Study," a set of lessons, reflections, and assignments that one may read and apply before being initiated into Kriya Yoga.

Editions 
The Autobiography of a Yogi was first printed in December 1946 by Philosophical Library, who printed it until 1953. In October 1953, Self-Realization Fellowship, Yogananda's organization, acquired the rights to the book and have been printing the book ever since, including translating it into over fifty languages. According to Project Gutenberg, the first edition of Autobiography of a Yogi is in the public domain in the USA.

Many editions of Autobiography of a Yogi have been printed, including the following.

Philosophical Library
The first four editions in the United States were published by the Philosophical Library.

Self-Realization Fellowship / Yogoda Satsanga Society of India
Self-Realization Fellowship has published the book in the United States since the fifth edition in 1954.

Jaico
An Indian edition has been published by Jaico.

Rider
British editions have been published by Rider since 1949.

Reprints of the first edition
The first edition, which is in the public domain according to Project Gutenberg, has more recently been reprinted by a number of publishers.

Adaptations and translations
The Autobiography is now available in a Kindle edition. An unabridged audio book (15 CDs) version narrated by Ben Kingsley and published by Self-Realization Fellowship (2004) is available in English and German. It is also offered as a download from iTunes.

Self-Realization Fellowship has translated the book into over fifty languages.

See also

 Awake: The Life of Yogananda
 Daya Mata
 Hinduism Invades America
 Kriya Yoga
 Mahavatar Babaji
 Panchanan Bhattacharya
 Rajarsi Janakananda

References

Further reading
 For further reading on the subject of editions, page 270.

 Includes history of the editions through 1956

Free online editions of 1946 first edition
 Crystal Clarity
 Gutenberg
 Healing Spiral at the Wayback Machine
 Holybooks 

1946 non-fiction books
Books about religion
Books about spirituality
Paramahansa Yogananda
Religious autobiographies
Classic yoga books
Indian autobiographies
American autobiographies
American memoirs